SDH may refer to:

Biology and Medicine
 Serine dehydratase
 Sorbitol dehydrogenase
 L-sorbose 1-dehydrogenase
 Subdural haematoma
 Succinate dehydrogenase

Organizations and places
 St David's Hall
 Social Democrats of Croatia
 Society for Digital Humanities
 Sydney Dental Hospital

Transportation
 Sudbury Hill Harrow railway station, England, National Rail station code

Other
 Shubnikov–de Haas effect
 Social Determinants of Health
 Southern Kurdish, by ISO 639-3 code
 Subtitles for the deaf and hard-of-hearing
 Synchronous digital hierarchy, in telecommunications